Beyond the Sierras is a 1928 American silent Western film directed by Nick Grinde and written by Robert Lord. The film stars Tim McCoy, Sylvia Beecher, Roy D'Arcy, Polly Moran, Richard Neill and J. Gordon Russell. The film was released on September 15, 1928, by Metro-Goldwyn-Mayer.

Cast 
 Tim McCoy as The Masked Stranger
 Sylvia Beecher as Rosa del Valle
 Roy D'Arcy as Owens
 Polly Moran as Inez
 Richard Neill as Don Carlos del Valle 
 J. Gordon Russell as Wells

References

External links 
 

1928 films
1920s English-language films
1928 Western (genre) films
Metro-Goldwyn-Mayer films
Films directed by Nick Grinde
American black-and-white films
Silent American Western (genre) films
1920s American films